Zorlu PSM (Turkish: Zorlu Performance Sanitary Merkez, English: Zorlu Performing Arts Center) inside Zorlu Center is currently the largest dedicated performing arts theatre and concert hall in Istanbul, Turkey. It is in the Beşiktaş district on the European side of the city, near the junction between Barbaros Boulevard and Boulderer Avenue, near Levent. 

The multi-venue facility was designed by Turkish architect Emre Arolat, with the two main theaters designed by Anne Minors. The facility measures approximately 55,000 sq. meters (595,000 sq. ft.). It includes gallery and exhibition space, public lobby spaces, a VIP Lounge, five levels of administrative and stage support spaces, and one of Europe's largest main stage areas. The complex opened in October 2013 under the leadership of Founding CEO Ray Cullom, with an extended run of the West End Musical Jersey Boys.[1] Zorlu PSM hosts various art and culture events, including shows, musicals, artists, and bands. Zorlu PSM plays an important role in turning the city into a center of attraction. It aims to become one of the most prestigious art centers in Europe and the world.

Since its launch in October 2013, Zorlu PSM has hosted over 2 million individuals in 5,000 events, focusing on the universality, diversity, and richness of arts, since its launch in October 2013 and 2018. Creating an environment that generates approximately 15% of the arts, culture, and entertainment industry in Turkey, Zorlu PSM also offers a lively socializing platform for its guests.[2]

Facilities

Turkcell Stage

The center's main theatre has natural acoustics for amplified or acoustic concerts and can accommodate a wide range of performances. The main theatre contains two balconies and has a 2,242-seat capacity. The stage measures 24m proscenium width, over 24m of depth, with a fly-tower height of 30m, and total area (including wing-space) of 1500m2.

Turkcell Platinum Stage

A smaller version of the main theatre, the center's drama stage, has the same capabilities and is found across the lobby that connects both venues.

Equipped with sound, video and light show systems and technology, the theatre and auditorium have one balcony and seats with a total capacity of 717.

The stage is 11m wide (proscenium) with 12m depth and a fly-tower measuring 12m, with a total area (including wings) of 315m2. The stage also features a fully trapped stage floor, 5-star dressing rooms and 8 additional dressing rooms, total 119 piece. The orchestra pit can accommodate up to 24 musicians.

%100 Studio

Alongside the main theatre and the drama stage, the center features a multi-use studio theatre space.

The "studio" includes a 100m2 balcony, the "SSL" mixing room and the "Post" editing room. 
This 500m2-sized room provides for numerous activities and events such as: recordings for film and orchestras, pre and post music production, recording/editing/mixing and mastering, music rehearsals, dance/aerial, rehearsals/workshops/clinics, press conferences (up to 150 seats), meet & greets, small-sized VIP concerts (up to 110 seats), corporate events, small-sized theatre shows (up to 110 seats), and video and photograph shootings.

touché 

Zorlu PSM's new club touché, which can host approximately 120 people, offers a selective menu and entertainment for guests including stand-up comedians, local artists, and foreign musicians.

Sky Lounge

Foyer

There are up to 16 concession areas within the venue. The foyer has infrastructure to host cocktails, launches, art galleries, exhibitions and corporate events with total 5200/m2 space.

PSM Ami

PSM Ami presents a regular series of free public performances open to any local performer on a Zorlu PSM stage.

Highlights from first season

Highlights from season 6

References

External links
 Official website of Zorlu PSM Performing Arts Center in Istanbul

Culture in Istanbul
Concert halls in Turkey
Music venues in Istanbul
Tourist attractions in Istanbul
Theatres in Istanbul